Stellantis Argentina S.A. is the Argentine subsidiary of international conglomerate Stellantis which produces and markets Citroën, Fiat, and Peugeot vehicles in the country. Established in 2021, the company is successor of several firms that had operated in Argentina as subsidiaries or licensors for these brands, such as Fiat Argentina (then FCA Argentina), and Groupe PSA Argentina.

Stellantis produces its vehicles in the former Sevel Argentina and Fiat Concord factories located in El Palomar, Buenos Aires, and Ferreyra, Córdoba, respectively.

History

Citroën brand in Argentina 

French automotive Citroën began to produce vehicles in 1960 with the launching of 3CV, being operative until 1979. In 1998 Sevel Argentina sold its share percent to PSA Group which brought the Peugeot and Citroën brands back to Argentina.

Fiat brand in Argentina 

After the dissolution of Sevel, Fiat resumed operations in Argentina in 1996. The company built a new plant in Ferreyra with an investment of USD600 million to produce its new models, the Palio and Siena. The company also took over IVECO operations in the country. Nevertheless, the 2001 economics crisis caused the plant was closed. It would not be resume operations until 2008.

The plant in Ferreyra has been producing the Fiat Cronos since 2018. In 2014, the company was renamed "FCA Argentina" after the Fiat and Chrysler merger. That allowed the Argentine subsidiary to import Chrysler Corporation brands to the Argentine market such as Jeep, Ram, and Alfa Romeo among others.

Peugeot brand in Argentina (1960–2021)  
The first Peugeot automobiles were brought to Argentina in 1957 through the establishment of DAPASA (acronym from "Distribuidora Automóviles Peugeot Argentina S.A.") which imported the 403 model. The society was then renamed "IAFA" and began producing the 403 in the new factory in Berazategui, Greater Buenos Aires from 1960 to 1965. During that period, a total of 22,000 units were manufactured.

IAFA launched the 404 model in 1962, which would become a success, being produced until 1980 by IAFA and continued shortly by Sevel Argentina. At the moment of being discontinued, a total of 152,000 units had been produced. In 1960, a new plant in El Palomar, Buenos Aires, was opened to produce Peugeot models, with its first cars being assembled in 1963.

After some irregularities detected in the IAFA's operations, a new company, SAFRAR ("Sociedad Anónima Franco Argentina de Automotores") was created in 1965. The company took over production of Peugeot models, launching the T48 (403 pickup) in 1967. Until 1973, when it was discontinued, 16,000 units were assembled. In 1969 SAFRAR launched the Peugeot 504 which would become not only an emblematic model for the brand but its most successful car for decades. Furthermore, at the moment of being discontinued, it had been the most produced models in the history of Argentine automotive, surpassing other legends like Renault 12 and Ford Falcon. It was produced until 1999 with near 400,000 units assembled. In 1973 the 404 pickup replaced its 403 counterpart, being produced until 1981.

In 1981, SAFRAR and Fiat Concord S.A. agreed to form a joint venture named Sevel Argentina. The merger was in response to law No Nº 21.932 of 1979, ordering the restructuring of the Argentine automotive industry. At first, Sevel resumed production of models previously made by both companies, but shortly afterwards it began to add new models

That same year Sevel launched the Peugeot 505, which was produced until 1995 with 92,000 units sold including a station wagon version, and the 504 pickup, produced until 1999 after 92,000 units.

After several years without new releases, in 1992 Sevel launched the Peugeot 405, which would be produced until 2001 totalising 51,000 units. The 306 was launched in 1996 and also discontinued in 2001 after 50,000 units produced in 4 and 5-door versions.

The Argentine economic crisis that began in 1994 affected the automotive production among other sectors. After Fiat and Peugeot split in 1995, PSA Group took over production of Peugeot and Citroën vehicles under the name of "Peugeot-Citroën de Argentina". Sevel was eventually liquidated, rescinding its Peugeot licence in March 2000, well into the Argentine economic crisis.

The first model under PSA's parenthood was the Partner, a panel van rebadged from the Citroën Berlingo, in 1998. Peugeot expanded its range of models with the 206 and its successor, the 207 (designed by Argentine and Brazilian engineers) with almost 500,000 units producing for both until 2016. The 307 was produced from 2004 to 2011 for a total of 183,000 units. It was replaced by the 408 in 2010.

In 2012, PSA launched the 308, another C-segment automobile, which had a similar platform than the discontinued 307.

Stellantis Argentina (2021–present) 

When Stellantis took over Argentine subsidiaries' operations, the company announced that some models would be discontinued, those were Peugeots 308 and 408 and Citroën C4, manufactured in the El Palomar plant that had belonged to Sevel (since 1981) and previously to SAFRAR. Those changes were in order to focus on the production of the 208.

In 2021, Stellantis was the lead manufacturer in South America with a 30% share, with a sales growth of 48% compared with 2020. The company also published a list of most selling cars in the region, where Fiat Cronos was the most successful model in Argentina. Stellantis also stated that the company expect to release 16 new models between 2022 and 2025. That will include 28 restylings and 7 electric and hybrid cars. In 2022, Stellantis stated that 70% of its production was exported to other markets, mainly Brazil.

Past models

Citroën past models (1998–2021) 
List of Citroën vehicles produced by PSA in Argentina until Stellantis was established:

Fiat past models (1996–2021) 
List of vehicles produced by Fiat Auto Argentina until Stellantis was established:

Peugoet past models (1960–2021) 
List of vehicles produced by Peugeot in Argentina since 1960 to 2021 when Stellantis was established:

Notes

Current models

Produced 
As of July 2022:

Notes

Imported 
Models from the brand's country of origin, except where it indicates: 

 Citroën C4 Aircross (Japan, 2013–15)
 Citroën C4 Cactus (Spain, 2017–)
 Citroën C5 Aircross (2020–)
 Fiat Argo (Brazil, 2017–)
 Fiat Mobi (Brazil, 2016–)
 Fiat Strada (Brazil, 1999–) 
 Fiat Tipo (Turkey, 2017–) 
 Fiat Toro (Brazil, 2016–)
 Peugeot 2008 (Brazil, 2016–)
 Peugeot 3008 (2021–)
 Peugeot 5008 (2021–)

References

External links 

 

Stellantis
Motor vehicle manufacturers of Argentina
1996 establishments in Argentina
Argentine subsidiaries of foreign companies